Events from the year 1615 in Sweden

Incumbents
 Monarch – Gustaf II Adolf

Events

 Wedding between Catherine of Sweden, Countess Palatine of Kleeburg and John Casimir, Count Palatine of Kleeburg.
 Swedish Siege of Pskov.

Births

 Klas Hansson Bjelkenstjerna, naval officer and civil servant (died 1662) 
 Lorentz Creutz, government administrator (died 1676)

Deaths

 10 January - Gustaf Brahe, official (b. 1668) 
 

 Evert Horn, soldier (born 1585)

References

 
Years of the 17th century in Sweden
Sweden